Eshqabad (also Romanized as ‘Eshqābād) is a city in and capital of Dastgerdan District, in Tabas County, South Khorasan Province, Iran. At the 2006 census, its population was 4,474, in 1,231 families.

References 

Populated places in Tabas County
Cities in South Khorasan Province